Trigena parilis is a moth in the family Cossidae. It was described by Schaus in 1892. It is found in Brazil.

References

Natural History Museum Lepidoptera generic names catalog

Cossinae
Moths described in 1892